Tucker Pillsbury, known professionally as Role Model (stylized in all caps), is an American singer-songwriter and former rapper. After self-releasing his debut extended play Arizona in the Summer in 2017, he earned a following online and was signed to Interscope Records in 2018. He later released two EPs–Oh, How Perfect (2019) and Our Little Angel (2020)–through Interscope and Polydor Records. His debut studio album, Rx, was released in 2022.

Early life
Tucker Pillsbury was born in Cape Elizabeth, Maine. His father, Rusty, is a real estate appraiser, and his mother, Susan Pillsbury, is a special education teacher in Cape Elizabeth. As a child, he was heavily inspired by Elvis Presley, and would perform to his family while dressed as him. Throughout high school, he took an interest in film, and in 2016, he moved to Pittsburgh to major in film at Point Park University. During his freshman year, he broke his wrist due to a skiing accident at Sugarloaf Mountain (Franklin County, Maine), and later broke his wrist again due to a skateboarding accident. While he was stuck in his dorm, two of his friends left music equipment in his dorm, prompting him to record several rap mixtapes while learning how to use Logic Pro. He soon dropped out of college after his grades started to fall.

Career
Role Model began rapping in 2016 under the mononym Tucker, and released his debut mixtape, Since When. He soon changed his stage name to Dillis, and self-released his debut album, Moth, in June 2016. That same month, he performed at a show at the Maine State Pier, and he later performed as an opener for Lil Debbie during her 2016 U.S. tour.

In early 2017, he changed his stage name to Role Model and switched from rapping to singing. He self-released his debut extended play, Arizona in the Summer, in December 2017 after recording it in his closet, which earned him a following online. After hearing the EP, rapper Mac Miller invited Role Model to Los Angeles for the two to work together. He was signed to Interscope Records in 2018. A music video for his song "Play the Part" was released in November 2018. His single "Minimal" was released in May 2019 along with a music video. He was featured on the song "Fucked Up, Kinda" from Julia Michaels's EP, Inner Monologue Part 2, released in June 2019. He released the music video for his single, "Hello", in October 2019. In November 2019, he released his second EP, Oh, How Perfect, in November 2019 through Interscope Records and Polydor Records. His first headlining tour, the Far from Perfect Tour, took place throughout late 2019.

In February 2020, he released an acoustic version of his song "Notice Me". He released his third EP, Our Little Angel, in October 2020 through Polydor Records. A music video for his song "Blind" was released in October 2020. In July 2021, he released the single "Forever&More", and in September 2021, he released the single "Death Wish". On February 18, 2022, he released the single "If Jesus Saves, She's My Type" alongside its music video. The same day, Role Model also announced the title, the tracklist, and the official release date of his debut album. In March 2022, he released the album's third single "Neverletyougo" with a music video. His debut album, Rx, was released on April 8, 2022. The music video for "Rx", the title track, was released on April 9, 2022.

Artistry
Role Model allegedly took his name from Paul Rudd's character in the 2008 film Role Models However, during the June 2022 Interview with Zach Sang, he confirmed this was a joke. He often plays acoustic guitar on his songs, and his music has been described as pop and bedroom pop. He has called Mac Miller an inspiration of his due to his influence on the city of Pittsburgh, and called meeting him "the most pivotal moment in [his] life". Critics have described his lyrics, which discuss topics such as sex, mental health, and relationships, as "relatable" and "confessional".

Personal life
Throughout his career, Pillsbury has been very open about mental health issues and his own depression. As of 2019, he is based in Hollywood. He is in a relationship with American social media influencer and model Emma Chamberlain.

Discography

Studio albums

Extended plays

Singles

References

21st-century American male musicians
American male pop singers
Bedroom pop musicians
Interscope Records artists
Musicians from Portland, Maine
Polydor Records artists
Singers from Los Angeles
Singer-songwriters from California
Living people
1997 births